Konopki Małe  is a village in the administrative district of Gmina Miłki, within Giżycko County, Warmian-Masurian Voivodeship, in northern Poland.

It was called "Klein Konopken" before 1925.

Notable residents
 Hans Jürgen Press (1926–2002), German illustrator and writer of children's books.

References

Villages in Giżycko County